Molly Sterling (born 8 March 1998) is an Irish singer and songwriter who represented Ireland in the Eurovision Song Contest 2015 with the song "Playing with Numbers".

Biography
Sterling grew up in Puckane, County Tipperary. She was educated at Kilkenny College and then at St. Andrew's College, Dublin.

Career

2011–14: Early beginnings
Molly Sterling first came to prominence after winning the Teen Idol contest in November 2011, winning a Popstar Studios recording prize. She won a second-place award for Girl's Vocal Solo at the 2012 Kilkenny Music Festival and supported Runaway GO at a gig in Nenagh Arts Centre on 9 June 2012. She finished second in TV3's All Ireland Schools' Talent Search in May 2014 and released her first EP, Strands of Heart, in November 2014.

2015–present: Eurovision Song Contest

On 27 February 2015 she was selected to represent Ireland in the Eurovision Song Contest 2015 with the song "Playing with Numbers". She performed in the second semi-final, but missed out on qualification for the final. At 17 years old, she was the youngest ever entrant to perform for Ireland in their history of participation.

Discography

Extended plays

Singles

See also
Ireland in the Eurovision Song Contest 2015

References

External links

Molly Sterling's Website

Last.fm page

Living people
1998 births
Eurovision Song Contest entrants of 2015
Eurovision Song Contest entrants for Ireland
Irish pop singers
People from County Tipperary
People educated at Kilkenny College
People educated at St Andrew's College, Dublin
21st-century Irish singers
21st-century Irish women singers